The United States women's national soccer team was founded in 1985.

1985–1999

1985–1989

1990–1999

2000–2019

2000–2009

2010–2019

2020–2029

2020–2029

Head-to-head records

Number of matches by state
Includes all matches on U.S. soil, including friendlies, Concacaf Championship, Olympic Qualifying, World Cup, 1996 Olympics, and others
Updated to February 22, 2023

Results by home stadium
Updated to February 22, 2023

References

United States women's national soccer team results